This is a list of windmills in the English county of Staffordshire.

Locations

A - B

C

D - F

G - H

K - M

N - Q

R - T

U - Y

Maps
1682 Joseph Brown
1686 Robert Plot
1747 Jeffrey
1749 Bowen
1775 Yates
1799 Yates
1814 Ordnance Survey
1817 Ordnance Survey
1818 C & G Greenwood
1820 C & G Greenwood
1820* Sherwood
1831 Yates
1834 Ordnance Survey

Notes

Mills in bold are still standing, known building dates are indicated in bold. Text in italics denotes indicates that the information is not confirmed, but is likely to be the case stated.

Sources
Unless otherwise indicated, the source for all entries is:-

References

History of Staffordshire
Tourist attractions in Staffordshire
Windmills in Staffordshire
Lists of windmills in England
Windmills